Maliq Bey Bushati (8 February 189020 February 1946) was an Albanian public official and politician. After the Italian invasion of Albania he became an Interior Minister in the Vërlaci government and afterwards Prime Minister of Albania during the Italian occupation from 13 February to 12 May 1943, thus an Axis collaborator.

Along with two other Axis Collaborators Lef Nosi and father Anton Harapi, he was sentenced to death by communist Albania.

Biography 
Maliq was born in Shkodër on 8 February 1890 to Hyssen Beg in the Alibegaj branch of the Bushati family. His father followed military education at the local school and in Istanbul afterwards. He served with the rank of binbaşı in Vilayet of Salonica during the first years of the 20th century, only to die suddenly at a young age in 1903.

References

1880 births
1946 deaths
People from Shkodër
People from Scutari vilayet
Albanian Fascist Party politicians
Government ministers of Albania
Prime Ministers of Albania
Albanian anti-communists
Albanian fascists
Albanian people executed by the communist regime
Executed prime ministers
Albanian people of World War II
Albanian collaborators with Fascist Italy
Maliq
Interior ministers of Albania
Robert College alumni